Joshua Miles may refer to:

 Joshua Weldon Miles (1858–1929), American politician
 Joshua Miles (American football), American football offensive tackle